The 2012 MTV Movie Awards were held on June 3, 2012 at the Gibson Amphitheatre in Universal City, California, hosted by Russell Brand.

The nominees were announced on May 1, and the winners were chosen by fans and a panel of MTV executives. On May 10, Russell Brand was announced to host the 2012 show.

Performers 
Martin Solveig (DJ Host)
fun. featuring Janelle Monáe — "We Are Young"
Wiz Khalifa — "Work Hard, Play Hard"
The Black Keys featuring Johnny Depp — "Gold on the Ceiling" and "Lonely Boy"

Presenters
Mark Wahlberg and Mila Kunis — presented Best On-Screen Dirt Bag
Andrew Garfield and Emma Stone — presented Breakthrough Performance
Logan Lerman, Ezra Miller, and Emma Watson — presented Best Male Performance
Kristen Stewart and Chris Hemsworth — presented Best Female Performance
Charlie Sheen — presented the Instant Cult Classics: Party Movie Basics segment, and Wiz Khalifa
Adam Sandler, Andy Samberg, and Leighton Meester — presented Best Kiss
Joe Perry and Steven Tyler — presented MTV Generation Award, and The Black Keys
Michael Fassbender and Charlize Theron — presented Best Fight
Kate Beckinsale and Jessica Biel — presented Best Cast
Matthew McConaughey, Channing Tatum, and Joe Manganiello — presented Best On-Screen Transformation
Martha MacIsaac, Steve Carell, Anna Faris, Jim Carrey, Octavia Spencer, Mila Kunis, and Jason Sudeikis — presented MTV Trailblazer Award
Christian Bale, Joseph Gordon-Levitt, Gary Oldman, and Christopher Nolan — presented an exclusive sneak peek of The Dark Knight Rises
Jodie Foster — presented Movie of the Year

Awards 
{| class="wikitable"
|-
! colspan="2" style="background:#EEDD82;"| Movie of the Year
|-
| colspan="2" valign="top" |
The Twilight Saga: Breaking Dawn: Part 1
Bridesmaids
The Hunger Games
Harry Potter and the Deathly Hallows – Part 2
The Help
|-
! style="background:#EEDD82;" width="50%"| Best Male Performance
! style="background:#EEDD82;" width="50%"| Best Female Performance
|-
| valign="top" |
Josh Hutcherson – The Hunger Games
Joseph Gordon-Levitt – 50/50
Ryan Gosling – Drive
Daniel Radcliffe – Harry Potter and the Deathly Hallows – Part 2
Channing Tatum – The Vow
| valign="top" |
Jennifer Lawrence – The Hunger GamesRooney Mara – The Girl With the Dragon Tattoo
Emma Stone – Crazy, Stupid, Love
Emma Watson – Harry Potter and the Deathly Hallows – Part 2
Kristen Wiig – Bridesmaids
|-
! style="background:#EEDD82;"| Breakthrough Performance
! style="background:#EEDD82;"| Best Comedic Performance
|-
| valign="top" |Shailene Woodley – The DescendantsElle Fanning – Super 8Melissa McCarthy – BridesmaidsRooney Mara – The Girl With the Dragon TattooLiam Hemsworth – The Hunger Games| valign="top" |
Melissa McCarthy – Bridesmaids
Jonah Hill – 21 Jump StreetKristen Wiig – BridesmaidsOliver Cooper – Project XRussell Brand – Hop|-
! style="background:#EEDD82;"| Best On-Screen Dirt Bag
! style="background:#EEDD82;"| Best Music
|-
| valign="top" |
Jennifer Aniston – Horrible Bosses
Bryce Dallas Howard – The HelpJon Hamm – BridesmaidsOliver Cooper – Project XColin Farrell – Horrible Bosses| valign="top" |
LMFAO — "Party Rock Anthem" (from 21 Jump Street)
College with Electric Youth — "A Real Hero" (from Drive)
The Chemical Brothers — "The Devil Is in the Details" (from Hanna)
Cody Simpson — "I Want Candy" (from Hop)
Kid Cudi — "Pursuit of Happiness (Steve Aoki remix)" (from Project X)
|-
! style="background:#EEDD82;"| Best On-Screen Transformation
! style="background:#EEDD82;"| Best Gut-Wrenching Performance
|-
| valign="top" |
Elizabeth Banks – The Hunger Games
Rooney Mara – The Girl With the Dragon TattooJohnny Depp – 21 Jump StreetMichelle Williams – My Week with MarilynColin Farrell – Horrible Bosses| valign="top" |
Accidentally Defecates on a Wedding Dress – Kristen Wiig, Maya Rudolph, Rose Byrne, Melissa McCarthy, Wendi McLendon-Covey and Ellie Kemper (from Bridesmaids)
Eating a Pie Made of Feces – Bryce Dallas Howard (from The Help)
Shoot in the Genitals – Jonah Hill and Rob Riggle (from 21 Jump Street)
North Bay Bridge Collapse Premonition – Nicholas D'Agosto (from Final Destination 5)
Climbing The Burj Khalifa – Tom Cruise (from Mission: Impossible – Ghost Protocol)
|-
! style="background:#EEDD82;"| Best Kiss
! style="background:#EEDD82;"| Best Fight
|-
| valign="top" |
Robert Pattinson and Kristen Stewart – The Twilight Saga: Breaking Dawn – Part 1
Channing Tatum and Rachel McAdams – The VowJennifer Lawrence and Josh Hutcherson – The Hunger GamesEmma Watson and Rupert Grint – Harry Potter and the Deathly Hallows – Part 2Ryan Gosling and Emma Stone – Crazy, Stupid, Love| valign="top" |
Jennifer Lawrence and Josh Hutcherson vs. Alexander Ludwig – The Hunger Games
Daniel Radcliffe vs. Ralph Fiennes – Harry Potter and the Deathly Hallows – Part 2Tom Cruise vs. Michael Nyqvist – Mission: Impossible – Ghost ProtocolChanning Tatum and Jonah Hill vs. the Kid Gang – 21 Jump StreetJoel Edgerton vs. Tom Hardy – Warrior|-
! style="background:#EEDD82;"| Best Cast
! style="background:#EEDD82;"| Best Hero
|-
| valign="top" |
Daniel Radcliffe, Rupert Grint, Emma Watson, and Tom Felton – Harry Potter and the Deathly Hallows – Part 2
Kristen Wiig, Maya Rudolph, Rose Byrne, Melissa McCarthy, Wendi McLendon-Covey, and Ellie Kemper – BridesmaidsJennifer Lawrence, Josh Hutcherson, Liam Hemsworth, Elizabeth Banks, Woody Harrelson, Lenny Kravitz, and Alexander Ludwig – The Hunger GamesJonah Hill, Channing Tatum, Ice Cube, Dave Franco, Ellie Kemper, Brie Larson, and Rob Riggle – 21 Jump StreetEmma Stone, Viola Davis, Bryce Dallas Howard, Octavia Spencer, and Jessica Chastain – The Help| valign="top" |
Daniel Radcliffe – Harry Potter and the Deathly Hallows – Part 2
Chris Evans – Captain America: The First AvengerChanning Tatum – 21 Jump StreetJennifer Lawrence – The Hunger GamesChris Hemsworth – Thor|-
! colspan="2" style="background:#EEDD82;"| Best Latino Actor
|-
| colspan="2" valign="top" |
Zoe Saldana – Colombiana
Diego Luna – Casa de Mi PadreDemián Bichir – A Better LifePenélope Cruz – Pirates of the Caribbean: On Stranger TidesHarmony Santana – Gun Hill Road|}

 MTV Generation Award 
Johnny Depp

 MTV Trailblazer Award 
Emma Stone

Sneak Peeks
Christian Bale, Gary Oldman, Joseph Gordon-Levitt and Christopher Nolan presented two clips, one of Nolan's The Dark Knight Trilogy'', and the second was a sneak peek of the conclusion of the trilogy The Dark Knight Rises.

References

External links 
 MTV Movie Awards official site

MTV Movie & TV Awards
MTV Movie Awards
MTV Movie
2012 in Los Angeles
2012 in American cinema